U105 is a Belfast, Northern Ireland, based radio station, providing a mix of music and speech as well as hourly news bulletins. It is owned by Wireless Group and was launched at 6am on 14 November 2005.

U105 broadcasts on 105.8 FM in Belfast and surrounding area, from studios at City Quays 2. Programmes are transmitted on FM from the Black Mountain transmitting station, located a few miles to the west of Belfast. The station also broadcasts throughout Northern Ireland on DAB and online. In the Q3 2021 RAJAR survey, the station had 217,000 weekly listeners, with total weekly hours of 2,102,000 (higher than its rival Downtown Radio, which had 64,000 more weekly listeners). At 9.69, the station had the highest weekly hours per listener among its main local commercial rivals (Cool FM, Downtown Radio, Downtown Country and Q Radio).

As of S
December 2022, the station broadcasts to a weekly audience of 231,000, according to RAJAR.

References

External links
 

Radio stations in Northern Ireland
Mass media in Belfast
Wireless Group